Vann is a surname.

Origins
Variant spellings of the surname include Van, Vanns, Avann, Fan, and Fann.

Statistics
The 1881 United Kingdom census found 668 people with the surname Vann, primarily in Leicestershire and Warwickshire. Data compiled by Patrick Hanks on the basis of the 2011 United Kingdom census and Census of Ireland 2011 found 1,085 people with the surname on the island of Great Britain, and three on the island of Ireland. In the United States, the 2010 Census found 15,416 people with the surname Vann, making it the 2,366th-most-common surname in the country. This represented an increase from 14,602 (2,280th-most-common) in the 2000 Census. In both censuses, slightly more than half of the bearers of the surname Vann identified as non-Hispanic White, and slightly less than one third as non-Hispanic Black or African American.

People

Entertainment
 Ameer Vann (born 1996), American rapper
 Amirah Vann (born 1980), American actress
 Barbara Vann (1938–2015), American theatre director and actor
 Stanley Vann (1910–2010), British musician

Government and politics
 Albert Vann (born 1934), member of the New York City Council from Brooklyn
 David Vann (mayor) (1928–2000), mayor of Birmingham, Alabama
 David Vann (Cherokee leader) (1800–1863), assistant principal chief and treasurer of the Cherokee Nation
 Earl Vann (1913–1985), member of the Pennsylvania House of Representatives
 Irving G. Vann (1842–1921), New York Court of Appeals judge
 James Vann ( – 1809), influential Cherokee leader
 John Paul Vann (1924–1972), lieutenant colonel in the United States Army
 Joseph Vann (1798–1844), Cherokee leader, son of James Vann

Religion
 Bernard Vann (1887–1918), English Anglican cleric and recipient of the Victoria Cross
 Cherry Vann (born 1956), British Anglican bishop
 Gerald Vann (1906–1963), British Roman Catholic theologian and philosopher
 Kevin Vann (born 1951), American prelate of the Roman Catholic Church

Sport
 Arthur Vann (1884–1915), English footballer
 Cleveland Vann (born 1951), American linebacker in the Canadian Football League
 Denis Vann (1916–1961), English cricketer
 John Vann (baseball) (1890–1958), American baseball catcher
 Kalev Vann (1956–2011), Australian rules footballer
 LaDaris Vann (born 1980), American football player
 LeRoy Vann (born 1986),  American football cornerback
 Mickey Vann (born 1943), British boxing referee and judge
 Norwood Vann (born 1962), American football player
 Ron Vann (born ), American football player
 Thad Vann (1907–1982), American college football coach

Other
 Barry A. Vann (born 1960), American social scientist
 Darren Deon Vann (born 1971), American serial killer
 Donald Vann (born 1949), Cherokee landscape painter
 James Allen Vann (1939–1986), American historian of early modern Germany
 Lizzie Vann, British businesswoman who founded children's food company Organix
 Michael G. Vann (born 1967), American historian of the French colonial empire
 Richard D. Vann, American professor of anesthesiology
 Robert Lee Vann (1879–1940), African-American newspaper publisher and editor
 Stanley Vann (1910–2010), English composer

See also
 Anna McVann (born 1968), Australian swimmer

References

English-language surnames
Surnames of English origin